Duvvur  is a village in Kadapa district of the Indian state of Andhra Pradesh. It is located in Duvvur mandal of Badvel revenue division.

Geography
It has an average elevation of 146 meters (482 feet).

References

Villages in Kadapa district